Station Square station is an intermodal transit station in the South Shore neighborhood of Pittsburgh, Pennsylvania, located at the Station Square shopping and entertainment complex. It is served by the Red Line, Blue Line, and Silver Line of the Pittsburgh Light Rail network, and is the northern terminus of the South Busway. The station is near the Monongahela Incline and the  Gateway Clipper Fleet.

History

This station is named after the nearby Station Square shopping and entertainment complex. The station was not originally planned to be built; instead, the light rail system was to bypass the newly created development because officials felt that there would not be enough ridership demand to justify the station. Active lobbying by Arthur P. Ziegler, Jr., President of Pittsburgh History and Landmarks Foundation, and developer of Station Square ensured that the station was constructed. Over 3 million tourists visit Station Square each year.

Originally designed and built by Daniel Sifer, the station encompasses railings rescued by Pittsburgh History and Landmarks Foundation from the Brady Street Bridge, which was demolished in 1978. In  the late 1990s, DRS Architects renovated the station and provided architectural details in glass that reflected the design in the Brady Street Bridge railings.

On August 5, 2018, a Norfolk Southern freight train running on the Mon Line derailed east of Station Square station and blocked the freight tracks, forcing service to be suspended. The derailed cars fell down the hillside and onto the light rail tracks and damaged  of light rail tracks;  of overhead electrical wires; and some concrete on the Panhandle Bridge. The derailment caused no injuries, as it occurred 2 minutes after a T light rail train departed the station. During cleanup and inspections of the area, the Mount Washington Transit Tunnel was closed and trains were rerouted via the former Brown Line through Allentown. The outbound tracks were opened on August 23, while inbound service resumed on August 25 after repairs were completed. A preliminary report by the Federal Railroad Administration's investigation team found that a fractured track caused the derailment. Norfolk Southern filed a lawsuit in December 2018 seeking $1.1 million in reimbursements from the city for the incident, claiming that they had neglected to maintain the hillside.

Connecting services
Y45 Baldwin Manor Flyer
Y47 Curry Flyer
Y49 Prospect Park Flyer
Y46 Elizabeth Flyer
39 Brookline
41 Bower Hill
44 Knoxville
48 Arlington Heights
51 Carrick
51L Carrick Limited
Y1 Large Flyer
MMVTA Route A
FACT Commuter Route
Monongahela Incline

See also 
Station Square
Pittsburgh & Lake Erie Railroad Station
Monongahela Incline

References

External links 

 Station from Google Maps Street View

Port Authority of Allegheny County stations
Railway stations in the United States opened in 1985
Blue Line (Pittsburgh)
Red Line (Pittsburgh)
Silver Line (Pittsburgh)
South Busway